The 1970 Isle of Man TT, the fourth round of the 1970 Grand Prix motorcycle racing season, involved a number of races on the Mountain Course on the Isle of Man. For the third consecutive year, Giacomo Agostini won both the Junior and Senior races, completing the six laps of the latter race in 2:13.47.6 to win by over five minutes. There were three "production" categories; Malcolm Uphill won the 750 cc, Frank Whiteway the 500 cc and Chas Mortimer the 250 cc. German pairs won both sidecar events; Klaus Enders and Wolfgang Kalauch in the 500 cc and Siegfried Schauzu and H. Schneider in the 750 cc. Kel Carruthers won the Lightweight 250 cc race, while Dieter Braun won the Lightweight 125 cc. Braun's victory was notable because he was one of only seven riders to have won an Isle of Man TT race in their first attempt. Due to the circuit's 37.7 mile length, it usually takes competitors two or three attempts before they learn its nuances.

There were six fatalities among the competitors, including world championship contender Santiago Herrero, making this the deadliest year in the history of the Isle of Man TT.

1970 Isle of Man Production 750 cc TT final standings
5 Laps (188.56 Miles) Mountain Course.

1970 Isle of Man Production 500 cc TT final standings
5 Laps (188.56 Miles) Mountain Course.

1970 Isle of Man Production 250 cc TT final standings
5 Laps (188.56 Miles) Mountain Course.

1970 Isle of Man Sidecar 750cc TT final standings
3 Laps (113.00 Miles) Mountain Course.

1970 Isle of Man Lightweight TT 250cc final standings
6 Laps (226.38 Miles) Mountain Course.

1970 Isle of Man Sidecar 500cc TT final standings
3 Laps (113.2 Miles) Mountain Course.

1970 Isle of Man Junior TT 350cc final standings
6 Laps (236.38 Miles) Mountain Course.

1970 Isle of Man Lightweight TT 125cc final standings
3 Laps (113.00 Miles) Mountain Course.

1970 Isle of Man Senior TT 500cc final standings
6 Laps (236.38 Miles) Mountain Course.

References

External links
 Detailed race results
 Mountain Course map

Isle of Man Tt
Tourist Trophy
Isle of Man TT
Isle of Man TT
Motorcycle racing controversies